"I'll Be There for You" is a song recorded by British-American girl group Solid HarmoniE, released in 1997 as the lead single from their only album, Solid HarmoniE (1997). Produced by Swedish producers and songwriters Kristian Lundin and Max Martin, who also wrote it, it remains the group's most successful song, peaking within the top 10 in the Netherlands and Sweden. Additionally, it was a top 20 hit in Denmark and the UK. In the US, it reached number  23 on the Billboard Bubbling Under Hot 100 chart. Two music videos were also produced, both directed by Gerry Wenner.

Critical reception
Pan-European magazine Music & Media wrote, "There's a real international aspect to this U.S. pop/dance quartet, A&R'ed out of the Netherlands, with Swedish producers; a female counterpart of the Backstreet Boys, perhaps? They have in common some really strong vocal harmonies and—if this example is anything to go by—some very convincing material. Frans van Dun, one of the programmers at leading Dutch AC network Sky Radio 100.7 FM/Hilversum, believes the comparison is an apt one. "They have a lot in common with the Backstreet Boys, who are very popular over here," he suggests. Van Dun continues: "It's the kind of pleasant, inoffensive track that's easy to programme and although it didn't test that well, we've stuck with it since it started to chart 11 weeks ago." Van Dun concludes: "For one reason or another, people do seem to like this thing , because it spent seven weeks in the singles Top 10." A reviewer from Sunday Mirror said that "they'll never change the world with bubblegum pop tunes" like "I'll Be There For You", "but they might just make you smilte."

Track listing
 12" single, UK (1997)
"I'll Be There for You" (Matthias Remix) – 6:45
"I'll Be There for You" (Poptastic Full on Mix) – 3:36
"I'll Be There for You" (Red 5 Remix) – 6:02
"I'll Be There for You" (Original Version) – 3:09

 CD single, Europe (1997)
"I'll Be There for You" (Single Edit) – 3:09
"I'll Be There for You" (Matthias Remix) – 6:45

 CD maxi, Europe (1997)
"I'll Be There for You" (Single Edit) – 3:09
"I'll Be There for You" (Matthias Remix) – 6:45
"I'll Be There for You" (Red 5 Remix) – 6:02
"I'll Be There for You" (Matthias Radio Edit) – 3:56

Charts

Weekly charts

Year-end charts

References

1997 singles
1997 songs
Solid HarmoniE songs
Jive Records singles
Songs written by Max Martin
Songs written by Kristian Lundin
Song recordings produced by Max Martin